Hima Shankar (born 2 June 1987) known as Hima Shankar Sheematty, is an Indian actress who appears in Malayalam films and short films. She has also directed and performed in many theatrical works. She took a part in the reality show Bigg Boss Malayalam.

Early life
Hima Shankar was born on 2 June in Thrissur, Kerala, India, to N K Shankaran Kutty and E V Kumari. She did her schooling in St. Don Bosco Girls High School, Kodakara and intermediate in Rajarshi Memorial Higher Secondary School, Aloor, Kerala. She has completed her graduation in BA in Sanskrit Vedanta from Sree Sankaracharya University of Sanskrit, Kalady. Subsequently she developed interest in theatre and joined University of Calicut School of Drama and Fine Arts, Thrissur for taking up post graduate degree in Theatre Arts. She played a character called Jennifer in TV serial, Ente Manasaputhri on Asianet. She was also part of some advertisements and albums. She runs an institution also.
She is an acting trainer too.

Career
Hima Shankar has started her career as a theatre artist later on moving to the Malayalam Film industry. She has enacted in the most discussed plays in Malayalam which were staged in the 2010s. Being an alumna of the most prestigious Drama School of Kerala, she has succeeded in balancing the engagement on the stage and in the screen. She is found to be an actor with opinion on the current social issues and observed to be outspoken always. Hence, she is a frequent panel member in evening newsroom discussions on social issues.

She was one of the contestant of Bigg Boss (Malayalam season 1) and got evicted on day 21. Later, she entered the house as a wildcard contestant on day 49. and got eliminated on day 77.

Filmography

Short filmography

Theatrical Works

TV/online shows
 Comedy Kondattam (Flowers)
 B Positive (Kairali News)
 Lavender (Kaumudy TV)
 Meet The Editors (Reporter TV)
 News n Views  (Kairali News)
 e Buz (Mathrubhumi News)
 Charutha (Kerala Vision)
 Varthaprabhatham (Asianet News)
 Chayakoottu (DD Malayalam)
 Malayali Darbar (Amrita TV)
 Morning Guest (Media One)
 Meet My Guest (Rosewbowl/ACV)
 Morning Show (Mathrubhumi News)
 Chuttuvattam (Asianet News)
 Midday News (Jaihind TV)
 Sreekandan Nair Show (Surya TV)
 Nammal Thammil (Asianet) 
 Chat with a Star
 Manorama News
 M7News
 Manorama Online
 Malayali Vartha
 Malayali Life Chit Chat
 Asianetnews.com
 E Times
 Kerala Talkies
 News X
 HotNSour TV
 Cinilife
 Jangospace
 Metromatinee
 Oneindia Malayalam

 Reality shows
2018 : Bigg Boss (Malayalam season 1) (Asianet) - Evicted on Day 77
2019 : Boeing Boeing (Zee Keralam)

TV series
2007-Ente Manasaputhri (Asianet) as Jennifer

Advertisements
 Girl Self Employed
 Manorama Magazine

Albums
 Sreenandhanam

References

Living people
21st-century Indian actresses
1987 births
Actresses from Thrissur
Actresses in Malayalam cinema
Actresses in Malayalam television
Bigg Boss Malayalam contestants